David Watkin may refer to:

 David Watkin (cinematographer) (1925–2008), British cinematographer
 David Watkin (historian) (1941-2018), Cambridge architectural historian

See also
David Watkins (disambiguation)